The 1917 Fulham by-election was held on 3 July 1917.  The by-election was held due to the incumbent Conservative MP, William Hayes Fisher, becoming President of the Local Government Board.  It was retained by Fisher who was unopposed.

References

Fulham by-election
Fulham,1917
Fulham,1917
Fulham by-election
Unopposed ministerial by-elections to the Parliament of the United Kingdom (need citation)
Fulham by-election